Benidorm Live is the stage adaption of British sitcom Benidorm, written by its writer and creator Derren Litten. The tour began in Newcastle, England at the Theatre Royal on 7 September 2018, and concluded in Canterbury, England at the Marlowe Theatre on 20 April 2019, spanning a total of 250 shows.

Background
The tour is a stage adaption of the British sitcom Benidorm, and is written by its writer and creator, Derren Litten. In August 2017, a spokesperson for the sitcom confirmed that Litten was in the process of writing the adaption. Dates were announced in November of the same year, with Litten stating:

"A live stage show Benidorm [..] has been talked about for many years.  My agent and I first started talking about a stage tour with a different producer who was very keen but said only an arena tour would be financially viable.  I don’t know much about producing theatre shows but I knew this definitely wasn’t the case [...] it has everything you love in [the] show, outrageous comedy, brilliant music, something to make you laugh and maybe even to make you cry.  I genuinely can’t wait for you to see it.
"

Cast
According to the official website, the main cast members who have appeared in the TV series are:
 Janine Duvitski as Jacqueline Stewart
 Shelley Longworth as Sam Wood
 Jake Canuso as Mateo Castellanos
 Adam Gillen as Liam Conroy
 Sherrie Hewson as Joyce Temple-Savage
 Tony Maudsley as Kenneth du Beke
 Asa Elliott as himself
Derren Litten as Derek (Birmingham dates only)

Tour dates

Notes

References

2018 plays
Comedy tours
British plays
Plays set in Spain